Vladan Kostić (Serbian Cyrillic: Bлaдaн Kocтић, born 25 April 1977 in Nikšić) is a Montenegro's football player.

International career
He has played for the FR Yugoslavia national team at the Millennium Cup, in India, held in January 2001, having played three matches. Some sources, the Serbian Federation as well, do not count this tournament matches as official.

References

External links
Profile at Playerhistory. 
Stats until 2003 at Dekisa. Tripod.

1977 births
Living people
Footballers from Nikšić
Association football midfielders
Serbia and Montenegro footballers
Serbia and Montenegro international footballers
Montenegrin footballers
FK Sutjeska Nikšić players
FK Vojvodina players
FC Baku players
FK Vardar players
FK Željezničar Sarajevo players
First League of Serbia and Montenegro players
Premier League of Bosnia and Herzegovina players
Serbia and Montenegro expatriate footballers
Expatriate footballers in Azerbaijan
Serbia and Montenegro expatriate sportspeople in Azerbaijan
Expatriate footballers in North Macedonia
Montenegrin expatriate sportspeople in North Macedonia
Expatriate footballers in Bosnia and Herzegovina
Montenegrin expatriate sportspeople in Bosnia and Herzegovina